Kawanda is a town in Wakiso District, Central Uganda.

Location

The town is in Kawanda Parish, Nabweru Sub-county, being one of the six parishes in that administrative unit. The coordinates of the Kawanda are 0°25'14.0"N, 32°32'26.0"E (Latitude:0.420556; Longitude:32.540556).

Overview
Kawanda is the location of Kawanda National Agricultural Research Laboratory, a unit of the National Agricultural Research Organisation. The laboratory carries out crop research, focusing primarily on banana varieties and their diseases.

The Uganda Electricity Transmission Company Limited maintains a major electricity substation that receives high voltage power from Bujagali Power Station via  of 220kV cables. A  440kV electricity power line from Karuma Power Station is under construction to the company substation in Kawanda, under the supervision of Intec Gopa International Energy Consultants GmbH of the Federal Republic of Germany.

References

Populated places in Central Region, Uganda
Cities in the Great Rift Valley
Wakiso District